Vandana Vaidya Pathak is an Indian actress who appears in Hindi films, stage and television. She is popular for her role as Jayshree Parekh in the Khichdi franchise; as well as her antagonistic role of Gaura in the soap opera Saath Nibhaana Saathiya. She has played many Gujarati roles in Indian serials. In a career spanning more than two decades, she has most of her memorable work in comedy plays and sitcoms.

Born and brought up in Ahmedabad, she is the daughter of Gujarati actor Arvind Vaidya. Making her television debut in 1995, she gained overnight stardom due to her terrific performance as Meenakshi Mathur in popular sitcom Hum Paanch.

Career
She started her career with Hum Paanch in 1995, which became one of the most popular comedic show of that time. She also acted in Gujarati plays. After the huge success of Hum Paanch, Pathak became an overnight star, and was chosen to star in another sitcom called Khichdi, playing the pivotal role of Jayashree Parekh, which gave her further recognition and fame. In 2005, she reprised the same character in its sequel, Instant Khichdi which was equally successful as its predecessor, making Pathak an established actress in Indian television medium. However, she was replaced by actress Nimisha Vakharia in the film adaptation of the series which was released in 2010.

She portrayed the twisted character of Sheela Devi in SAB TV's popular light-comedy show Main Kab Saas Banoongi.

In 2011, she had a starring role in another comedy show R. K. Laxman Ki Duniya. She also starred in Mahisagar.

She played the role of an alien in television series Badi Door Se Aaye Hai. She said that she took inspiration from her father for the character.

In 2015, she entered Star Plus's longest-running popular show Saath Nibhaana Saathiya. Pathak said that she "had been doing comedy for the last 14 years" and "was on the lookout for more serious roles when Gaura of Saathiya came her way." The character became huge popular among audiences, and she was praised for bringing toughness to her negative portrayal. She took a break from the show in May 2016; but returned to the series in October 2016. The show went off-air in July 2017.

In 2017, she bagged the villainous character of Padmini (also called Vaidehi) in Colors TV's medical drama show Savitri Devi College & Hospital, which is created by Rashmi Sharma with whom Pathak had worked in Saath Nibhaana Saathiya.

Personal life
Pathak was brought up in Ahmedabad, where her father, Arvind Vaidya, was a noted personality of Gujarati Theatre. She is married to writer-director Neeraj Pathak who has made films like, Apne, Gumnaam (2008) and Right Yaaa Wrong (2010). The couple has two children: son Yash and daughter Radhika.

In 2016, she rolled down the stairs and injured herself on the sets of her show Saath Nibhaana Saathiya.

It was speculated that Pathak and her co-star Rupal Patel were having a professional war on the sets of Saath Nibhaana Saathiya, but Pathak denied these rumors and states ''Rupal is a professional and we do greet each other everyday. We are just two different people.''

Television series
 Hum Paanch as Meenakshi Mathur (1995–1996, 2005–2006)
 Ek Mahal Ho Sapno Ka (1999–2002)
 Khichdi as Jayshree Parekh (2002-2004)
 Ye Meri Life Hai as Rasik's wife, Pooja's mother (2004–2005)
 Instant Khichdi as Jayshree Parekh (2005)
 Main Kab Saas Banoongi as Sheela Devi (2008–2009)
 Mrs. & Mr. Sharma Allahabadwale as Rajshri Shah (2010–2011)
 R K Laxman Ki Duniya as Bakula "Baku" Bhavesh Vasavda (2011–2013) 
  Mahisagar as Anusuya Mehta (2014–2015)
 Badi Door Se Aaye Hai as Daadi "90" (2014–2015)
 Saath Nibhaana Saathiya as Gaura Suryavanshi (2015–2016; 2016–2017)
 Savitri Devi College & Hospital as Padmini/Vaidehi (2017–2018)
 Khichdi Returns as Jayshree Parekh (2018)
 Yeh Teri Galiyan as Parvati (2018)
 Manmohini as Devki Dai (2018–2019)

Filmography 

 Golkeri (2020, Gujarati)
Kehvatlal Parivar (2022, Gujarati)

References

External links
 

Living people
Actresses from Ahmedabad
20th-century Indian actresses
21st-century Indian actresses
Indian film actresses
Indian television actresses
Indian stage actresses
Indian soap opera actresses
Actresses in Hindi television
Actresses in Gujarati cinema
Year of birth missing (living people)